Hudson Street is an American sitcom that aired on ABC for one season, from 1995 to 1996. The series starred and was executive produced by Tony Danza with Lori Loughlin also starring.

Synopsis
Danza starred as Tony Canetti, a divorced detective in Hoboken, New Jersey, who shares custody of his son Mickey with his ex-wife. In between work and raising his son, Tony also starts a romance with an idealistic crime reporter, Melanie (Lori Loughlin).

The series received good reviews and initially placed in the top ten (partly due to its placement between the ABC hits Roseanne and Home Improvement), but the series was cancelled after one season as it could not hold on to its lead-in audience. ABC moved the series to Saturday nights in 1996 which sealed its fate for cancellation.

Cast
 Tony Danza as Tony Canetti
 Lori Loughlin as Melanie Clifford
 Frankie J. Galasso as Mickey Canetti
 Jerry Adler as Al Teischler
 Christine Dunford as Det. Kirby McIntire
 Tom Gallop as Off. R. Regelski
 Jeffrey Anderson-Gunter as Winston Silvera
 Shareen J. Mitchell as Lucy Canetti

Episode list

Awards and nominations

References

External links
 

1990s American sitcoms
1995 American television series debuts
1996 American television series endings
American Broadcasting Company original programming
English-language television shows
Television shows set in New Jersey
Television series by Sony Pictures Television